Dorcas Lillian Bates Reilly (July 22, 1926 - October 15, 2018) was an American chef and inventor. Reilly worked for several years in the Campbell's Test Kitchen creating new recipes. She is best known for the creation of the green bean casserole. Reilly was called the "Grandmother of the Green Bean Bake."

Biography 
Reilly was born Dorcas Lillian Bates in Woodbury, New Jersey on July 22, 1926. She grew up in Glassboro and later in Camden. Reilly attended Camden High School, along with her future husband, Thomas H. Reilly. Dorcas Reilly went on to Drexel University where she earned a degree in home economics in 1947. She was one of the first members of her family to go to college. 

Reilly started working at the Campbell's Test Kitchen in 1949. She was one of the first full time employees in the department. Reilly went on to become the supervisor in the home economics department. She also worked as a recipe developer. During her time at the test kitchen, she created hundreds of different recipes, including Campbell's tomato soup meatloaf, a tuna-noodle casserole, types of porcupine meatballs, and the Sloppy Joe "souperburger." She is best known for her creation of the green bean casserole.

In 1959, she married Thomas H. Reilly. Dorcas Reilly left the Campbell's Test Kitchen briefly to raise her children in 1961. She returned later to work as the manager of the Test Kitchen. During her time back at Campell's she was cited by the Courier-Post as an expert in "cooking and entertaining." Reilly retired in 1988. In 2002, Reilly and Campbell's donated her recipe for green bean casserole to the National Inventors Hall of Fame.

Reilly died on October 15, 2018, in Camden from Alzheimer's disease.

References

20th-century American inventors
1926 births
2018 deaths
Camden High School (New Jersey) alumni
Drexel University alumni
Campbell Soup Company people
People from Camden, New Jersey
People from Glassboro, New Jersey
People from Woodbury, New Jersey
Women inventors
Deaths from Alzheimer's disease
20th-century American women
21st-century American women